Tom Baker (August 23, 1940 – September 2, 1982) was an American actor who starred in the Andy Warhol film I, a Man (1967). He was a close friend of Jim Morrison of The Doors.

Early life
Baker was the son of Tom Baker Jr. and Ellie, military parents who retired in San Francisco. His older sister married and then divorced a well-known British Formula 1 racer. He was of Irish descent.

Career
Baker started his career as a stage actor in New York City and assisted Norman Mailer in the stage adaptation of Mailer's novel The Deer Park. Once he moved to Hollywood, he acted in a series of B movies. He also continued to do stage work, directing the 1973 premiere of The Grabbing of the Fairy, a masque by Michael McClure.

He produced and directed his own film, Bongo Wolf's Revenge in 1970. The cast included Severn Darden and P. J. Proby. A number of people from Jim Morrison's circle of friends worked on the production including Paul Ferrara, Babe Hill and Frank Lisciandro and music was provided by Mike Bloomfield and The Doors. 
Andy Warhol cast Baker in one of his films, I, A Man (reportedly as a replacement for Morrison, who dropped out) and one of his co-stars was Valerie Solanas, who later shot Warhol in his office at The Factory.

Relationship with Jim Morrison
The relationship he had with Morrison and Morrison's long term girlfriend Pamela Courson was described in a memoir, Blue Centre Light, and an extract was published in High Times in June 1981. The stormy friendship between the three of them is depicted in the stage play The Lizard King, written by Jay Jeff Jones, which was produced in Los Angeles in 1991.

Clay Wilcox took the role of Baker and Jim Morrison was played by Stephen Nichols.

In November 1969, Morrison found himself in trouble with the law after harassing airline staff during a flight to Phoenix, Arizona to see The Rolling Stones in concert. Both he and fellow traveller Baker were charged with "interfering with the flight of an intercontinental aircraft and public drunkenness".

Death
Tom Baker died of a drug overdose in 1982 in New York City, in the loft on 14th Street which he shared with friend and actor Bob Brady who starred in Liquid Sky. His death caused confusion in the media. British actor Tom Baker was more well-known at the time, due to his portrayal of the Doctor on the BBC programme Doctor Who, and was also a heavy drinker at that time. Some publications mistakenly reported that the British actor had died.

Fictional portrayals
Baker is portrayed by actor Michael Madsen in the Oliver Stone film The Doors (1991). He is portrayed by Bill Sage in the film about Valerie Solanas, I Shot Andy Warhol (1996).

Author and singer Kinky Friedman dedicated his novel Elvis, Jesus & Coca-Cola to Baker, who had been his friend, and the plot of the book features Baker's wake.

Filmography

References

External links

A memoir by Legs McNeil

American male film actors
1940 births
1982 deaths
20th-century American male actors
Drug-related deaths in New York City
Jim Morrison